Scott Gutschewski (born October 1, 1976) is an American professional golfer who plays on the PGA Tour. He previously played on the Korn Ferry Tour (then known as the Nationwide Tour), where he was a two-time winner.

Amateur career
Gutschewski was born in Omaha, Nebraska. He played college golf at both Creighton University and the University of Nebraska and helped lead the Huskers to a 14th-place finish at the NCAA Championships in his senior year (1999). He turned professional after graduating from Nebraska.

Professional career
Gutschewski began his professional career on the Tight Lies Tour, Prairie Tour, NGA Hooters Tour and the Canadian Tour. He joined the Nationwide Tour in 2003 and finished in 26th on the money list in his rookie season. He picked up his first professional win at the Monterey Peninsula Classic. He finished in 17th on the Nationwide Tour's money list in 2004 and that earned him his PGA Tour card for 2005. In his rookie season on the PGA Tour, Gutschewski finished 149th on the money list to retain partial status on tour for 2006. His performance in 2006 was not good enough to retain his tour card but instead he earned his card for 2007 through qualifying school. Gutschewski had another poor season in 2007 but this time he was not able to retain his card through qualifying school. He returned to the Nationwide Tour in 2008 and picked up his second professional victory at the Rex Hospital Open. The victory helped him finish in 21st on the tour's money list, earning his PGA Tour card for 2009. He lost his tour card after finishing outside the top 150 and went back to the Nationwide Tour for 2010. He finished the year 20th on the money list and earned his 2011 PGA Tour card. After the 2011 season, Gutschewski battled injury and took some time away from playing. He considered a future in coaching collegiate golf, and even joined the coaching staff for the Creighton University Men's Golf Team in 2012 while undergoing rehab for his injured foot. In 2021, a decade removed from last earning a PGA Tour card, Gutschewski finished within the top 25 at the Korn Ferry Tour Finals and earned his PGA Tour card once again for the 2021–22 season.

At the 2022 Barracuda Championship, Gutschewski carded his best PGA Tour finish to date – 5th alone with +35 points (the Barracuda Championship utilizes the Modified Stableford Scoring system).

Professional wins (2)

Nationwide Tour wins (2)

Results in major championships

CUT = missed the half-way cut
"T" = tied
Note: Gutschewski never played in the Masters Tournament or the PGA Championship.

See also
2004 Nationwide Tour graduates
2006 PGA Tour Qualifying School graduates
2008 Nationwide Tour graduates
2010 Nationwide Tour graduates
2021 Korn Ferry Tour Finals graduates

References

External links

American male golfers
Creighton Bluejays men's golfers
Nebraska Cornhuskers men's golfers
PGA Tour golfers
Korn Ferry Tour graduates
Golfers from Nebraska
Golfers from Texas
Sportspeople from Omaha, Nebraska
People from Prosper, Texas
1976 births
Living people